Andreas Engel is a Swiss structural biologist and co-founder of the Maurice E. Müller Institute for Structural Biology at the Biozentrum of the University of Basel.

Life
Engel studied physics and mathematics in Bern (PhD 1972) and at the Johns Hopkins University, Baltimore. In 1974 he joined the Biozentrum Basel. In 1986, after work in industry, he became Professor for Structural Biology. Engel and Ueli Aebi established the Maurice E. Müller Institute for Structural Biology. After becoming professor emeritus in 2010, Engel joined the Case Western Reserve University, to build up the Cleveland Center for Membrane and Structural Biology. He worked at the Department of Bionanoscience, part of the Kavli Institute of Nanoscience and TU Delft until his retirement in 2018. Engel loves to ski, climb, and sketch.

Work

Engel pioneered the application of scanning transmission electron microscopy (STEM) and atomic force microscopy (AFM) to image biomolecular complexes. Mass measurements using STEM, 2-dimensional crystallization of membrane proteins, cryo-electron crystallography and AFM were applied to study the structure of supramolecular assemblies [5]. Gram negative and positive pathogens, as well as bacterial envelopes were analyzed. Fujiyoshi and Engel solved the structure of Aquaporin-1 in collaboration with Agre. Together with Palczewski Engel’s team discovered the packing arrangement of rhodopsin in the retina.
Engel developed the first curriculum in nanoscale sciences that attracted many young talents to the University of Basel. Similar programs have since been implemented in many top universities.

Awards and honors 
1996 Elected Member of the European Molecular Biology Organization
1999 Max Gruber Lecture, Groningen
2006 Karl Friederich Bonhoeffer Lecture, Göttingen
2006 Edmund de Rothschild Lecture, Paris
2012 Doctor Medicinae Honoris Causa, Aarhus University

References

External links 

Living people
Johns Hopkins University alumni
Members of the European Molecular Biology Organization
University of Basel alumni
Biozentrum University of Basel
Swiss biologists
Year of birth missing (living people)